The 1955 All-Eastern football team consists of American football players chosen by various selectors as the best players at each position among the Eastern colleges and universities during the 1955 college football season.

Quarterbacks 
 George Welsh, Navy (AP-1 [b], INS-1)

Halfbacks 
 Jim Brown, Syracuse (AP-1 [b], INS-1)
 Lenny Moore, Penn State (AP-1 [b], INS-1)

Fullbacks 
 Charles Sticka, Trinity (NC) (AP-1 [b], INS-1)

Ends 
 Ron Beagle, Navy (AP-1, INS-1)
 John Paluck, Pittsburgh (AP-1)
 Joe Walton, Pittsburgh (INS-1)

Tackles 
 Phil Tarasovic, Yale (AP-1, INS-1)
 Thomas Powell, Colgate (AP-1)
 Bill Doremus, Lehigh (INS-1)

Guards 
 Bill Meigs, Harvard (AP-1, INS-1)
 Stanley Slater, Army (AP-1)
 Jim Buonopane, Holy Cross (INS-1)

Center 
 John Cenci, Pittsburgh (AP-1)
 Frank Reich, Penn State (INS-1)

Key
 AP = Associated Press
 INS = International News Service

See also
 1955 College Football All-America Team

References

All-Eastern
All-Eastern college football teams